Lewesdon Hill is a hill in west Dorset, England.

Geography

Location 
Lewesdon Hill stands about 4 km west of Beaminster, 1½ km south of Broadwindsor, 2 miles south of Mosterton,
1½ km west-northwest of Stoke Abbott and 3 km east of another hillfort-topped eminence, Pilsdon Pen. To the south of the hill is the Marshwood Vale and to the north is the valley of the River Axe.

Summit 
Lewesdon is the county top of Dorset. Its summit is an elongated ridge surrounded by beech woods. The actual summit is a low grassy mound at the east end of the ridge. For many years, nearby Pilsdon Pen (277 m) was thought to be Dorset's highest hill, until modern survey revealed that Lewesdon Hill was 2 metres higher. Dorset's third highest point is Bulbarrow Hill (274 m). Lewesdon's topographic prominence of 185 metres qualifies it as a Marilyn.

Geology 
The hill is formed from upper greensand which is more resistant to erosion than the surrounding clay.

History 
Like many of the high hills in Dorset, including its neighbour Pilsdon Pen, it is the site of an Iron Age hillfort. Parts of the original bank and ditch are still visible although they have been disturbed by gravel quarrying and timber removal. The remains of the hillfort are a scheduled monument.

Lewesdon was also the site of one of the Armada Beacons in 1588 used to warn of impending attack by Spain.

Access 
It is a National Trust property. There are two main footpaths leading up to the summit, one from the village of Broadwindsor, and one from Coombe Lane (off the B3162 between Broadwindsor and Bridport, just before the Four Ash crossroads). The Coombe Lane footpath leads to the hill via another, smaller hill, Crabb's Hill, which is privately owned. The east–west footpath is part of the Wessex Ridgeway.

References

Gallery 

Hills of Dorset
Hill forts in Dorset
Marilyns of England
Highest points of English counties
National Trust properties in Dorset